Alejandra Gabaglio (born 17 October 1966) is an Argentine table tennis player. She competed in the women's doubles event at the 1992 Summer Olympics.

References

1966 births
Living people
Argentine female table tennis players
Olympic table tennis players of Argentina
Table tennis players at the 1992 Summer Olympics
Sportspeople from Buenos Aires